Ichoria quadrigutta is a moth of the subfamily Arctiinae. It was described by Francis Walker in 1854. It is found in Mexico, Guatemala and Costa Rica.

References

 

Arctiinae
Moths described in 1854